The Sport-Club Frankfurt 1880 e.V. (or SC 1880 Frankfurt) is a German sports club from Frankfurt am Main. The club is mainly known for its rugby union team, which currently plays in the Rugby-Bundesliga, the highest level of the league system for rugby union in Germany. Apart from rugby, the club hosts other sports such as athletics, curling, field hockey, lacrosse, and tennis.

The club was, for a time, one of only two professional rugby clubs in Germany, the other being Heidelberger RK. The turn to professionalism in a sport otherwise fully amateur in Germany was made possible through the support of Uli Byszio, who owns a gold- and silver trading business. The club became an amateur side once more after the 2012–13 season.

History
The SC 1880 was formed in 1880 as a rugby club through the merger of two local rugby sides, "Germania" and "Franconia". It was formed as "FC 1880 Frankfurt" as a distinction between rugby and football was not made in Germany at that time.

Rugby quickly gained in popularity at that time and Frankfurt became the first German team to travel to England, playing the Blackheath Football Club in 1894. Blackheath awarded the club the right to adopt its club colours of red and black, which are still the colours SC 1880 plays in today. In 1905, a field hockey département was established, and in 1914 the club changed its name to the current SC 1880 Frankfurt. Before that, in 1910, the club won its first national rugby title, winning the second edition of the German rugby union championship. In 1913, it repeated this achievement. The club also represented Germany at the 1900 World Expo in Paris, which was part of the rugby tournament of the 1900 Summer Olympics. The club thereby achieved Germany's only rugby medal at Olympic games to date.

In 1922–23, the club moved to its current home ground. In this era, two more national titles followed, in 1922 and 1925. In 1926 and 1931, the SC 1880 reached the final but lost. Before and after the war, the club played regular friendlies with the Oxford Greyhounds and after the Second World War the club travelled to Oxford in 1951 and had the English team return the visit in 1953.

Success on the rugby field was limited after this and a losing appearances in the 1952 and 1969 finals was all it had to show for.

With the establishment of the Rugby-Bundesliga in 1971, SC 1880 seems to have lost completely in importance and the new millennium found the club as a struggling second division outfit, having been relegated from the Rugby-Bundesliga in 1999. After suffering relegation from the second division in 2004, the club quickly rebounded and returned to this level the season after. With the help of foreign players and coaches, the fortunes of the club turned after this. A large part of the success of the club hails from the financial support of Uli Byszio, a former player, who led the way in professionalising the club.

In the 2005–06 season, the club earned promotion to the Rugby-Bundesliga by winning the 2nd Bundesliga South/West and then defeating RK 03 Berlin, the North/East champion, 39–5.

Upon return to the Bundesliga, the club performed impressively, finishing the 2006–07 season with twelve wins, one draw and one loss on top of the table. In the final however, played at home, the team slipped up and lost to the RG Heidelberg 15–23.

The following season, 2007–08, the team finished on top again and this time it fared better in the final, beating RG Heidelberg 28–13 to win its fifth German title and its first in 83 years, having last won it in 1925. With Villiame Gadolo, the club had a player with rugby world cup experience in its ranks. Due to the large number of New Zealanders in the side, the team actually performed the Haka before the match.

Shortly before winning the title, coach George Simpkin left the club and was replaced by Phil "Lofty" Stevenson, who was also, at the time, Germany's sevens coach. The team nevertheless continued in 2008–09 as it had finished the previous season, dominating the league and finishing on top, with 14 wins and two losses, while its reserve side won the 2nd Bundesliga South/West title. The senior team then moved on to beat Berliner Rugby Club in the semi-finals of the German championship, to reach the national title game against Heidelberger RK. An 11–8 victory over HRK earned the club its sixth German championship.

Throughout its history, the SC 1880 provided 36 players to the German national rugby union team who won 142 caps between them. In 2008, the club had players from more than 20 different nations in its ranks and its first three teams play at first, second and third level in the German league system. While the club only provided one player to the German team in 2008, Rolf Wacha, it was expected that Frankfurt's professional approach to rugby was going to improve this situation; great progress has been made in the youth département of the club in this regard. The club's concept envisions that by 2014 the whole first team will hail from the youth département and replace the need for foreign top-players.

In the 2009–10 season, Frankfurt took out the minor premiership once more, for a fourth time in a row, but lost the final in extra time to Heidelberger RK. The following year, Frankfurt reached the final for a fifth consecutive time but lost 9–12. After two lost finals in a row, the club decided to replace its coach, with Sam Alatini taking over from Aaron Satchwell for 2011–12, a move that proved unsuccessful with Frankfurt losing in the semi-finals at home to newly promoted TV Pforzheim.

In 2011–12, the club also took part in the North Sea Cup, a European Cup competition made up of two clubs each from Belgium, Germany and the Netherlands. While unsuccessful at national level the club did win the North Sea Cup with a 26–19 victory over Heidelberger RK.

SC 1880 finished first in their group in the 2012–13 season and qualified for the south/west division of the championship round, where it also came fifth. The club was knocked out in the quarter finals of the play-offs after a 7–49 loss to Heidelberger RK. At the end of the season, the club opted to return to an amateur side, thereby being forced to withdraw its reserve team from the 2nd Bundesliga to the 3rd Liga because of a reduction of the size of the playing squad. Previously, the club's reserve side had played for many years in the 2nd Bundesliga South/West, where it has won the league championship in 2009 and 2012.

SC 1880 was less competitive in 2013–14 and 2014–15 then it had been in the recent past, finishing only seventh in each season the championship round and missing out on the play-off altogether. In the 2015-2016 season this improved to 6th position and also included a run to the semifinal of the DRV Pokal where they were defeated 10-21 by TSV Handshusheim. Carrying this momentum into the upcoming 2016-2017 season the club are optimistic that they will be in a position to challenge for silverware again at the end season.

The 2015-2016 season was overall an outstanding season for the SC1880 rugby club in general due to the performances from the age group teams winning what departing head of rugby Tim Matawatu named "The Grand Slam". The U12, U14, U16 and U18 were all crowned German Champions this season which is unprecedented in German rugby and means the future of ruby at SC1880 looks very bright.

Current squad

Club honours

Rugby
The club's honours:
 German rugby union championship
 Champions: 1910, 1913, 1922, 1925, 2008, 2009
 Runners up: 1920, 1926, 1931, 1952, 1969, 2007, 2010, 2011
 German rugby union cup
 Winner: 2007, 2009, 2010
 Runners up: 2011
 German sevens championship
 Champions: 2007, 2010
 Runners up: 2008
 2nd Rugby-Bundesliga
 Champions: 2006, 2009‡, 2012‡
 Division champions: 2006, 2009‡, 2012‡
 North Sea Cup
 Winner: 2012
 ‡ Denotes won by reserve team.

Field hockey

Men
German national title: 3
1968–69, 1969–70, 1988–89
EuroHockey Club Champions Cup: 2
1974, 1975

Women
German national title: 2
1987–88, 1988–89

Recent seasons
Recent seasons of the club:

First team

 Until 2001, when the single-division Bundesliga was established, the season was divided in autumn and spring, a Vorrunde and Endrunde, whereby the top teams of the Rugby-Bundesliga would play out the championship while the bottom teams together with the autumn 2nd Bundesliga champion would play for Bundesliga qualification. The remainder of the 2nd Bundesliga teams would play a spring round to determine the relegated clubs. Where two placing's are shown, the first is autumn, the second spring. In 2012 the Bundesliga was expanded from ten to 24 teams and the 2nd Bundesliga from 20 to 24 with the leagues divided into four regional divisions.

Reserve team

Rugby internationals
In Germany's 2006–08 European Nations Cup campaign, Christian Baracat and Rolf Wacha were called up for the national team.

In the 2008–10 campaign, Wacha appeared for 80 and Germany again, while Benjamin Brierley, Jamie Houston, Daniel Preussner, Alexander Hauck and Mark Sztyndera were new additions to the club's list of internationals.

In the 2010–12 campaign, Mark Sztyndera and Alexander Hauck were re-selected for the German team while Jannis Läpple, Keiran Manawatu and Sam Henderson made their debut.

For the opening match of the 2012–14 edition of the ENC against the Ukraine the club had only Kieran Manawatu selected for the team.

The club had no player selected for the German under-18 team at the 2009 European Under-18 Rugby Union Championship, but three for the 2010 tournament, Lukas Deichmann, Jens Listmann and Adam Howes.

Coaches
Recent coaches of the club:

References

External links
  Official website
 SC 1880 Frankfurt picture gallery
 SC 1880 Frankfurt team info at totalrugby.de

German rugby union clubs
Field hockey clubs in Germany
Field hockey clubs established in 1905
Sports clubs established in 1880
Rugby clubs established in 1880
Multi-sport clubs in Germany
Rugby union in Frankfurt
1880 establishments in Germany